Andreas Pantelidis (born 26 May 1962) is a Greek alpine skier. He competed in three events at the 1984 Winter Olympics.

References

External links
 

1962 births
Living people
Greek male alpine skiers
Olympic alpine skiers of Greece
Alpine skiers at the 1984 Winter Olympics
Sportspeople from Veria